Didier Paris (born 14 February 1954) is a French lawyer politician of La République En Marche! (LREM) who was elected to the French National Assembly on 18 June 2017, representing the south of the department of Côte-d'Or. From 1997 till 2000, he was the sub-prefect of Beaune.

Political career
In parliament, Paris serves on the Committee on Legal Affairs. In addition to his committee assignments, he is part of the French-Iranian Parliamentary Friendship Group.

Since 2019, Paris has been serving as one of his parliamentary group's spokespersons under the leadership of its chairman Gilles Le Gendre.

See also
 2017 French legislative election

References

Living people
Deputies of the 15th National Assembly of the French Fifth Republic
La République En Marche! politicians
Place of birth missing (living people)
1954 births
Deputies of the 16th National Assembly of the French Fifth Republic